The Francis Boyer Award was the highest honor conferred by the American Enterprise Institute for Public Policy Research. It was named for Francis Boyer, a chief executive at Smith, Kline & French in the mid-twentieth century and a strong supporter of AEI who died in 1972. The Boyer Award was replaced in 2003 by the Irving Kristol Award.

List of recipients

References

External links
List of Francis Boyer Award recipients

American awards
American Enterprise Institute